Qaleh-ye Dez Do (also Romanized as  Qal‘eh-ye Dez Do and Qal‘eh-ye Dozdū; also known as Qal‘eh Dez, Qal‘eh-ye Dez, and Qalmāb) is a village in Qilab Rural District, Alvar-e Garmsiri District, Andimeshk County, Khuzestan Province, Iran. At the 2006 census, its population was 23, in 4 families.

References 

Populated places in Andimeshk County